The 1993 Barilla Indoors was a women's tennis tournament played on indoor carpet courts at the Saalsporthalle Allmend in Zürich in Switzerland and was part of the 1993 WTA Tour. It was the 10th edition of the tournament, which had been upgraded from Tier II to Tier I,  and was held from 4 October through 10 October 1993. Third-seeded Manuela Maleeva-Fragniere won the singles title and earned $150,000 first-prize money.

Finals

Singles
 Manuela Maleeva-Fragniere defeated  Martina Navratilova 6–3, 7–6(7–1)
 It was Maleeva-Fragniere's 2nd singles title of the year and the 18th of her career.

Doubles
 Zina Garrison-Jackson /  Martina Navratilova defeated  Gigi Fernández /  Natasha Zvereva 6–3, 5–7, 6–3

References

External links
 ITF tournament edition details
 Tournament draws

European Indoors
Zurich Open
1993 in Swiss tennis
1993 in Swiss women's sport